The Bundeshaus (Federal House) is a building complex in Bonn, Germany, which served as the Provisional Parliament House of West Germany, and thus the seat of the German Bundestag and Bundesrat, from 1949 until 1999. The main building, constructed between 1930 and 1933, served as a Pedagogical Academy until the end of the Second World War.

For over forty years it served as the seat of both constitutional bodies. The Bundeshaus was expanded and renovated numerous times until these institutions were transferred to Berlin after the Hauptstadtbeschluss (Capital Resolution) in 1999, nine years after the German reunification.

The parliamentary chamber then became the "Internationale Kongresszentrum Bundeshaus Bonn", now known as the "World Conference Center Bonn", in which national and international conferences take place. The southern part of the building is to become the headquarters of the Climate Secretariat of the United Nations as part of the "UN-Campus", including the former Abgeordnetenhochhaus and the office block known as "Langer Eugen" (Tall Eugene, nickname of Eugen Gerstenmaier, former President of the Bundestag).

The Haus der Geschichte provides an opportunity to book tours and to visit the former Bundesrat.

External links

History of the Bundeshaus from the World Conference Center Bonn
 Information about guidances by the Haus der Geschichte
 Techwhiff

Buildings and structures in Bonn
Landmarks in Germany
Germany
Government buildings in Germany
Former seats of national legislatures
Government buildings completed in 1933